The Former Eldora Public Library is a historic building located in Eldora, Iowa, United States.  On December 30, 1901, the Carnegie Foundation agreed to grant the community $10,000 to build a new library building.  The Chicago architectural firm of Patton & Miller designed it in the Renaissance Revival style, and it was dedicated on May 11, 1903.  The single-story, brick structure is somewhat rare in that its plan is an asymmetrical massing of intersecting gables.  The entrance pavilion is located at the intersection of the two masses. The building was listed on the National Register of Historic Places in 1983.  In 2010 it was included as a contributing property in the Eldora Downtown Historic District in 2010.  The library has subsequently moved to a new facility, and this building has been converted for commercial use.

References

Library buildings completed in 1903
Renaissance Revival architecture in Iowa
Eldora, Iowa
Buildings and structures in Hardin County, Iowa
National Register of Historic Places in Hardin County, Iowa
Libraries on the National Register of Historic Places in Iowa
Carnegie libraries in Iowa
Individually listed contributing properties to historic districts on the National Register in Iowa